Pissonotus albovenosus is a species of delphacid planthopper, in the family Delphacidae.

Habitat
It is found in the Caribbean, Central America, and North America.

References

Further reading

 

Articles created by Qbugbot
Insects described in 1935
Delphacini